Christoph Gustav Ernst Ahl (1 September 1898 – 14 February 1945) was a German zoologist, born in Berlin.

He was the director of the department of ichthyology and herpetology in the Museum für Naturkunde.

He was also the editor in chief of the review Das Aquarium from 1927 to 1934.

During World War II, Ahl fought in the ranks of the Wehrmacht - in Poland, North Africa and later Yugoslavia. He was executed while in refuge in Yugoslavia, after the partisans found out he was a German.

He performed one of the first studies on bearded dragons determining what genus they belong to.

Ahl is commemorated in the scientific names of two species of lizards: Anolis ahli and Emoia ahli. The latter is a synonym of Emoia battersbyi.

See also
:Category:Taxa named by Ernst Ahl

References

Further reading
Paepke, Hans-Joachim (1995). "Über das Leben und Werk von Ernst Ahl [= About the Life and Work of Ernst Ahl]". Mitteilungen aus dem Zoologischen Museum in Berlin 71 (1): 79–101. (in German).

1898 births
1945 deaths
20th-century German zoologists
German herpetologists
German ichthyologists
Nazi Party members
German military personnel killed in World War II
Scientists active at the Museum für Naturkunde, Berlin
People killed by Yugoslav Partisans
German Army personnel of World War II
Nazis executed in Yugoslavia
Sturmabteilung personnel